Barranca is a district of the Puntarenas canton, in the Puntarenas province of Costa Rica.

History 
Barranca was created on 20 November 1965 by Ley 3594. Segregated from Puntarenas.

Geography 
Barranca has an area of  km² and an elevation of  metres.

Demographics 

For the 2011 census, Barranca had a population of  inhabitants.

Transportation

Road transportation 
The district is covered by the following road routes:
 National Route 1
 National Route 17
 National Route 23

References 

Districts of Puntarenas Province
Populated places in Puntarenas Province